KATG may refer to:

 KATG (FM), a radio station (88.1 FM) licensed Elkhart, Texas, United States
 Keith and The Girl, comedy podcast
 Kool & the Gang, American band